Coastal Carolina University (CCU or Coastal) is a public university in Conway, South Carolina. Founded in 1954 as Coastal Carolina Junior College, and later joining the University of South Carolina System as USC Coastal Carolina, it became an independent university in 1993.

The university is a national sea-grant institution and owns part of Waties Island, an Atlantic barrier island that serves as a natural laboratory for CCU's instruction and research. The campus is also the home of the Horry County Schools Scholars Academy, a high school for gifted students.

History

Coastal Carolina University was founded in 1954 as Coastal Carolina Junior College, a two-year community college, by the Coastal Educational Foundation, a group of citizens who wanted to establish a post-secondary institution in the region. The college originally operated under contract as an extension of the College of Charleston. Classes met at night at Conway High School and were taught by part-time faculty. After the College of Charleston contract expired in 1958, Coastal became an independent community college supported by Horry County.

The Horry County Educational Commission was created in 1959 to oversee the college's county tax money. This body was responsible for contracting operations to the University of South Carolina a year later under the name Coastal Carolina Regional Campus. The deal was finalized at the Chat 'n' Chew restaurant in Turbeville, South Carolina, a town halfway between Conway and Columbia. The site of the present-day campus, by now known as USC Coastal Carolina College, was chosen in 1960, on a plot of land between U.S. 501 and S.C. 544, on land owned by Burroughs Timber Company and International Paper. The campus' first building, later named the Edward M. Singleton Building, opened in 1963.

A decade of growth saw the school add a third year in 1973 and a fourth in 1974. The first residence halls (currently "The Woods" residence halls) opened in 1987. By 1991, enrollment had grown to over 4,000 students, leading the Coastal Educational Foundation and Horry County Educational Commission to seek independent status for the school. A year later, the USC system's board of trustees lent its support to independent status for Coastal. On July 1, 1993, the school officially became an autonomous state institution under the name Coastal Carolina University, in a bill signed into law by South Carolina Governor Carroll Campbell on the steps of the Singleton Building. Ronald R. Ingle, the last chancellor of Coastal Carolina College, became the newly minted university's first president. The Coastal Carolina Chanticleers football team opened its inaugural game vs. Newberry College on Sept. 6, 2003, in front of a crowd of more than 8,000 at the newly opened Brooks Stadium. In 2004, Coastal Carolina University celebrated its 50th anniversary; the same year, enrollment reached 7,000 students, and CCU opened the first phase of the University Place housing complex across S.C. 544.

Throughout the 2010s, the university experienced a building boom achieved as a result of a local 1-cent sales tax for education-related construction (the present Brittain Hall was originally dubbed "Penny Hall" in honor of the penny tax that helped fund its construction). In 2014, the university established its first doctoral degree program, in coastal and marine science systems science. In 2016, the Coastal Carolina Chanticleers athletic programs officially joined the Sun Belt Conference. The following year, enrollment reached 10,600 students and the Chanticleers baseball team won the College World Series, the first national title for the university.

Leadership 

In October 2020, Coastal Carolina University announced the appointment of Michael T. Benson as its next president. Benson began his tenure on January 1, 2021. He replaced David A. DeCenzo, who retired after serving for nearly 14 years as the university's president.

Academic organization

E. Craig Wall Sr. College of Business Administration

The business college, named for prominent area businessman E. Craig Wall Sr. (1911-1985), offers six undergraduate majors: accounting, economics, finance, management, marketing and hospitality and resort tourism management. The PGA Golf Management program is one of only 18 programs in the nation accredited by the PGA of America. Business students can also minor in business, economics, international business or marketing. The business college also offers two graduate programs, the Master of Business Administration (MBA) program and the Master of Accountancy (MAcc) program, and a graduate certificate in fraud examination. For those who wish to earn a degree in a shorter amount of time, there is a Degree in Three program where students can earn a Bachelor of Science in Business Administration (BSBA) degree in three years; and the Get More in Four program, which is a combined four-year undergraduate and Master of Business Administration (MBA) program. The Wall College of Business is accredited by the Association to Advance Collegiate Schools of Business (AACSB International).

The Wall College is also home to several programs and centers.
BB&T Grant Center for Real Estate and Economic Development
Clay Brittain Jr. Center for Resort Tourism
Professional Golf Management Program
 Wall Fellows Program
 Wall Center for Excellence

Spadoni College of Education and Social Sciences
The Spadoni College of Education and Social Sciences grants the degrees Bachelor of Arts in the areas of early childhood education, elementary education, middle-level education, and special education learning disabilies; Bachelor of Science in physical education; Master of Education in the areas of educational leadership, Instructional Technology, Special Education, and in Language, Literacy and Culture. A Master of Arts in Teaching program is offered in six specialization areas, and certificate and licensure programs are offered in online teaching, literacy and special education. The Interdisciplinary Ph.D. in Education will be offered in Spring 2019. The College of Education is accredited by the National Council for the Accreditation of Teacher Education (NCATE), and each of its constituent programs is recognized by the South Carolina Department of Education and its corresponding specialized professional association (SPA). The Spadoni College of Education is home to several research and outreach endeavors, including the Biddle Center for Teaching, Learning, and Community Engagement; the Chanticleer Center for Literacy Education; The Early Childhood Development and Literacy Center; and The Georgetown Education Residence program.

On October 1, 2020, the university announced that it would be restructuring the Spadoni College of Education by combining it with programs from the Edwards College of Humanities and Fine Arts, as well as the Gupta College of Science. On July 1, 2021, the name of the college was changed to the Spadoni College of Education and Social Sciences. Dr. Holley Tankersley was named the first dean of the newly combined college.

Thomas W. and Robin W. Edwards College of Humanities and Fine Arts

The Edwards College houses the departments of anthropology and geography; communication, digital culture and design; English; history; languages and intercultural studies; music; philosophy and religious studies; politics; art history; art studio; intelligence and national security; and theatre (including four B.F.A programs). It offers more than 15 undergraduate degree programs in the humanities and fine arts, as well as 25 undergraduate minor programs. In addition, the Edwards College offers graduate programs in writing (MA) and liberal studies (MA).

The Edwards College houses several university initiatives, institutes and centers, including the Dyer Institute for Leadership and Public Policy, the Jackson Family Center for Ethics and Values, the Joyner Institute for Gullah and African Diaspora Studies; and the Athenaeum Press. The Press is a student-driven publishing lab that offers students professional-level hands-on experience in authoring, designing and producing innovative stories.

As the home of the Department of Music, all university bands and ensembles are housed within the Edwards College of Humanities and Fine Arts. These include: Acoustic Songbook; Brass Quartet; CCU Jazz Ensemble; Concert Choir; Flute Choir; Guitar Ensemble; Opera Workshop; Percussion Ensemble; POP 101; Saxophone Ensemble; Symphonic Band; The Chanticleer Regiment World Percussion Ensemble Marching Band and Chanticleer Pep Band; and Wind Ensemble.

Gupta College of Science
The Gupta College of Science currently offers 17 areas of study ranging from biochemistry to sociology, as well as 22 minors and three certificate programs. The Gupta College of Science also offers a Master of Science degree in coastal marine and wetland studies and a Doctor of Philosophy (Ph.D.) degree in coastal and marine systems science. The Marine Systems department houses four sea vessels for both teaching and research. The flagship of the fleet is the R/V Coastal Explorer, a 54 ft. coastal region research vessel. The Gupta College of Science houses the departments of biology, chemistry, coastal and marine systems science, computing sciences, health sciences, kinesiology, marine science, mathematics and statistics, physics and engineering science, psychology, recreation and sport management, and sociology. In 2016, the university opened a new $30 million, 71,150 sq. ft. science complex, initially called "Science Annex II." The Burroughs & Chapin Center for Marine and Wetland Studies is the research and community outreach arm of the college.

In 2019, the College of Science was renamed to be the Gupta College of Science.

Reserve Officers Training Corps (ROTC) and Veterans Services
Coastal Carolina University is home to the Chanticleer Company of the U.S. Army ROTC program. CCU's Office of Veterans Services provides the growing veteran and veteran family member population at CCU. The university's Center for Military and Veterans Studies records and preserves the oral histories of South Carolina veterans for the Library of Congress.

The Kimbel Library and Bryan Information Commons
Opened in 1977, the Kimbel Library provides research collections and resources to support students, faculty and the surrounding community. The library also serves as a government repository and houses the Horry County Archives Center. Study spaces in the Kimbel library include technology equipped study and presentation rooms for student use and instruction rooms for librarian led instruction sessions. Located on the first floor, the Peter C. Bolton Help Desk is the main information service center of the library and commons and is staffed during all hours that the library and commons is open. Students can purchase beverages and snacks at the Starbucks located on the first floor.

The Bryan Information Commons is a state-of-the-art, two-story addition to the Kimbel Library. The Information Commons provides individual computer workstations, collaborative group media:scape workstations, high-tech study and presentation rooms and additional seating for study.
The library and commons buildings were open 24 hours a day, seven days a week until the Fall 2020 semester, when rescheduling was necessary due to position cuts caused by the COVID-19 pandemic.

In 2021, it was announced that the Kimbel Library would  undergo a $10 million renovation that will include an interior redesign and reconfiguration, upgrades to the HVAC system and a multi-function instruction area and is  estimated to be completed by the end of 2024. The university has also received state approval to build a $29.8 million Library Learning Complex that will be located next to the Kimbel Library, and will consist of a two-story 64,000 square-foot facility, that will feature study rooms, a virtual reality lab and student computing services,  the tentative completion date for the Library Learning Complex is fall 2023. Both of the projects are being funded primarily by the counties penny sales tax for education.

Accreditation
The university is accredited by the Commission on Colleges of the Southern Association of Colleges and Schools (SACS). In addition, several of the university's other programs have been accredited. They include:

The E. Craig Wall, Sr. College of Business Administration - accredited by AACSB (Association to Advance Collegiate Schools of Business).
The Spadoni College of Education - accredited by the National Council for Accreditation of Teacher Education (NCATE) as well as the South Carolina State Board of Education.
The Department of Computer Science - accredited by the Accreditation Board for Engineering and Technology (ABET).
The university is also an accredited institutional member of the National Association of Schools of Art and Design (NASAD).

Student life

Student facilities

The Lib Jackson Student Union serves as the hub for student life at Coastal Carolina University. It contains a 250-seat movie theater/auditorium, conference rooms, a convenience store, as well as an entertainment and gaming area.

The HTC Recreation & Convocation Center opened in 2012. The LEED-certified convocation center features a 3,370 multi-purpose arena, bookstore, as well as a recreation center open to students, faculty, and staff. The recreation center features a large workout area with cardio machines, weight training, and a full indoor track. It is also home to several group exercise studios, a rock climbing wall, as well as ping pong tables.

The arena portion of the HTC Center is home to both men's and women's basketball and women's volleyball teams, whose games were formerly held in Kimbel Arena. The arena is overlooked by private suites and a catering and banquet facility.

University housing
The university requires all freshmen and sophomores to live on campus; the university houses approximately 4,800 in on-campus living facilities. Freshmen are primarily assigned to on-campus housing. Freshmen are primarily housed in the dorm-style Ingle Hall and Eaglin Hall as well as the suite-style Woods residence halls (Cypress, Dogwood, Elm, Maple, Oak, and Palmetto). In Fall of 2015, Chanticleer Hall and Tradition Hall opened, followed by Teal Hall and the formerly named CINO Hall in Fall 2016. On January 28, 2019, CINO Hall was renamed Pat Singleton-Young Hall, after Pat Singleton-Young, who worked for Coastal Carolina for over forty years and founded the department of Multicultural Services and Diversity. Sophomores are primarily housed in University Place and The Gardens. For upperclassmen, there are several off-campus student housing apartment-style complexes located near the university.

The CCU Student Housing Foundation was created in 2003 as a nonprofit corporation to lease, manage and contract for the construction of student housing facilities. The Foundation oversaw the construction of University Place, and the university's trustees moved to purchase University Place from the foundation in 2014.

The most recent student housing is the 1,270-bed complex on the north end of the campus. The first two halls, Tradition Hall and Chanticleer Hall were completed for the Fall 2015 semester. Tradition and Chanticleer Halls include clusters of rooms reserved for honors students as well as three special interest communities; "TEACH Community" for education majors, Wall $treet Business Community for business majors, and the SEA Floor for social and educational programming focusing on marine sciences. The last two buildings, Teal Hall and Pat Singleton-Young Hall opened for the Fall 2016 semester. The four-building complex also features office space, conference and meeting rooms, recreation and a new dining hall.

University Place 
Located 1 mile from main campus off S.C. 544, University Place consists of 46 apartment-style buildings, separated into five distinct neighborhoods; Blue Ridge and Piedmont (Also known as the "Blue Tops"; constructed by the university in 2004 and 2005), as well as Grand Strand, Sandhills, and Low Country (Also known as the "Red Tops"; originally constructed as off-campus housing but later purchased by the university).

University Place contains an activity house with a fitness center and outdoor pool, several basketball and volleyball courts, as well as the UP Dining Hall, which opened at the beginning of the Spring 2018 semester.

Shuttle buses run every 10–15 minutes between University Place and main campus.

The Gardens 
The Gardens is the only main campus residential community dedicated solely to returning and transfer students. The Gardens is located in the Quail Run community and consists of Azalea Hall and Magnolia Hall. These residence halls were built in the late 1980s, at the same time as the Woods residence halls.

Campus transportation
The university operates a free shuttle system that runs on both weekdays and weekends. The shuttles, modeled after classic trolleys, run approximately every 10 minutes during peak hours, but stop less often during non-peak times. The Teal Shuttle route runs on weekdays between main campus and University Place. The Black Shuttle route runs between main campus and the Science Center and Band Hall across U.S. 501; the Black Shuttle also stops at the Myrtle Ridge Walmart during evening hours. The Bronze Shuttle runs on weekends and services all stops on the shuttle routes. The university also runs free shuttles during Fall, Winter, and Spring breaks, shuttling students to and from the Myrtle Beach International Airport and the Florence Amtrak station. The shuttle routes converge at a solar-powered bus shelter, donated by the Santee Cooper electric company in front of the Student Center.

In addition to free shuttles, the university has more than 600 bicycles that are available to be checked out by students for use on campus. Until the Fall 2020 semester, the campus housed an on-campus fleet of Zipcars.

Student activities
Student organizations include the Student Government Association (SGA), S.T.A.R. (Students Taking Active Responsibility) and the Coastal Activities Board, along with a number of other academic, honor, service, interest, social and religious organizations. Intramural sports are also offered through the Department of Campus Recreation.

The SGA is the governing body of the campus and is in charge of allocating and disbursing funds to the clubs and organizations on campus. Executive positions include president, executive vice-president, chief of staff, president pro-tempore, vice president for finance and vice president for public relations. Elections for SGA positions are held each spring. The SGA's legislative body is composed of two senators from each grade and college who are elected by the student body. SGA has passed legislation to change various policies on campus. Over the years, they have passed legislation to create the HTC Center, Rowdy Rooster and have made replacement CINO cards free to students as well as more.

Club sports

Coastal Carolina University also boasts an array of 22 competitive and non-competitive club sports including: baseball, soccer (M), soccer (W), lacrosse (M), lacrosse (W), fishing, surfing, rugby, equestrian, field hockey, and Quidditch.

The Chanticleer Rugby club, a member of USA Rugby South, won the Small College National Championship in 2009. The club also won the 2009 NSCRO Men's Division III Rugby Tournament.

Student media 
The Chanticleer — The student newspaper
Archarios – A student-produced literary art magazine
Tempo — A student-produced features magazine
WCCU — A student-run online radio station

Greek life
About three percent of undergraduate men and five percent of undergraduate women are active in CCU's Greek system.

Interfraternity Council
Alpha Chi Rho
Alpha Sigma Phi
Kappa Alpha Order
Kappa Sigma
Phi Gamma Delta
Pi Kappa Phi
Sigma Phi Epsilon

College Panhellenic Council
 Alpha Delta Pi
 Alpha Xi Delta
 Chi Omega
 Gamma Phi Beta
 Phi Sigma Sigma
 Sigma Kappa
 Sigma Sigma Sigma

National Pan-Hellenic Council
 Alpha Kappa Alpha sorority
 Alpha Phi Alpha fraternity
 Delta Sigma Theta sorority
 Phi Beta Sigma fraternity
 Sigma Gamma Rho sorority

National Association of Latino Fraternity Organization
 Alpha Psi Lambda

Athletics

From 1983 through the 2015–16 school year, Coastal Carolina's athletic programs competed in NCAA Division I as a member of the Big South Conference, while the football team, which began play in 2003, competed in the NCAA Football Championship Subdivision (FCS). On September 1, 2015, Coastal Carolina announced it would leave the Big South Conference following the 2015–16 school year to transition to FBS-level football and the Sun Belt Conference. The university joined in all sports except for football starting July 1, 2016, with football joining in 2017.

The football team plays at the 20,000-seat Brooks Stadium, which is notable for its teal artificial turf. Following the announcement of the university joining the Sun Belt Conference, Brooks Stadium will undergo construction to expand the stadium to 20,000 seats; the NCAA requires FBS programs to maintain an average attendance of at least 15,000 over a rolling two-year cycle. The addition will complete a lower-level seating bowl between the home, visitors, and student sections, as well as adding a second level to the section backing up to S.C. 544.

Coastal Carolina 's athletic teams were once known as the Trojans. Once the school established an affiliation with the University of South Carolina, Coastal Carolina decided to select a mascot in line with the parent institution's mascot, the Gamecock. The ultimate choice was the Chanticleer (pronounced SHON-ti-clear), the proud, witty rooster made famous in "The Nun's Priest's Tale" of Chaucer's The Canterbury Tales. The university's teams are affectionately known as the Chants (pronounced "shonts") and the mascot itself is named Chauncey. When Coastal Carolina became an independent university in 1993, despite some calls for "a complete split from USC" (i.e., change the mascot), the Chanticleer remained the school's mascot. The university also has a live rooster (Chanticleer) that appears at events periodically, such as home football games. , the live mascot is "Maddox".

In 2013, TD Bank gave CCU a $5 million gift. In September 2014, CCU officially renamed its sports facilities as the TD Sports Complex. In 2016, CCU won its first NCAA national title in baseball at the College World Series in Omaha, winning the deciding game 4–3 in the best-of-three final series against the University of Arizona. The championship was won mere hours before Coastal officially joined the Sun Belt.

The volleyball program is one of the most successful teams in the country. It won four consecutive conference championships (Big South 2014, 2015) (Sun Belt 2016, 2017). Leah Hardeman ('14 -'17) is the only player in Division 1 history to win four conference player of the year awards.

The Men's Soccer team has won 15 regular season and 16 Conference Tournament Championships as of 2020. They have played in 17 NCAA Tournaments, reaching the Sweet 16 five times.

Notable alumni

Athletics
Andrew Beckwith, Most Outstanding Player of the 2016 College World Series, won by the Chanticleers
Mickey Brantley, Former Seattle Mariners and Yomiuri Giants outfielder
Brandon Brown, NASCAR XFINITY Series Driver
Amber Campbell, Hammer thrower at 2005 & 2009 World Championships, and the 2008, 2012 and 2016 Summer Olympics
Kheli Dube, Former MLS forward, New England Revolution
Tony Dunkin, The only NCAA Division I men's basketball player to be honored as his conference player of the year all four years
Jeffrey Gunter, NFL defensive end, Cincinnati Bengals
Tom Gillis, PGA Tour professional
Gary Gilmore, CCU Head Baseball Coach, 2016 National Coach of the Year, also played collegiate baseball at CCU
Keith Glauber, Former Cincinnati Reds pitcher
Brad Goldberg, MLB pitcher
Matt Hazel, NFL wide receiver for the Washington Redskins
De'Angelo Henderson, NFL running back for the Denver Broncos
Dustin Johnson, 23-Time PGA Tour winner & member of the 2010, 2012 & 2016 winning USA Ryder Cup Team, 2011, 2015 & 2017 Presidents Cup Team, 2016 U.S. Open Champion and 2020 Masters. 2016 PGA Player of the year, leading money winner & Harry Vardon Trophy winner, and former World No.1.
Tommy La Stella, San Francisco Giants infielder
Isaiah Likely, NFL tight end, Baltimore Ravens
Luis Lopez, Former Toronto Blue Jays and Montreal Expos infielder
Kirt Manwaring, Former MLB catcher for the San Francisco Giants, Colorado Rockies and Houston Astros
Jacob May, MLB outfielder for the Chicago White Sox
Grayson McCall, current Chanticleers quarterback; Sun Belt Conference Player of the Year in 2020 and 2021
Joseph Ngwenya, Former MLS forward, drafted 3rd overall in the 2004 MLS SuperDraft
Josh Norman, Pro-Bowl NFL cornerback, Carolina Panthers, Washington Redskins, Buffalo Bills, and San Francisco 49ers.
Pedro Ribeiro, Midfielder, Orlando City SC
Stu Riddle, Head coach of the University at Buffalo (SUNY) soccer team; 1996 Olympian for New Zealand
Maurice Simpkins, Former NFL linebacker
Jerome Simpson, Former NFL wide receiver for the Minnesota Vikings and Cincinnati Bengals
Sabastian Söderberg, PGA European Tour, Winner of the 2019 Omega European Masters
Lorenzo Taliaferro, Former NFL running back, Baltimore Ravens
Quinton Teal, Defensive back, San Diego Chargers
Tyler Thigpen, Former NFL quarterback
Mike Tolbert, All Pro NFL fullback, Buffalo Bills

Arts, entertainment, and media 
Madelyn Cline, Actress known for her role as Sarah Cameron on Outer Banks
Diamond Dallas Page, Former WWE and WCW professional wrestler. 2017 WWE Hall of Fame inductee
Bailey Hanks, Actress and winner of MTV's Legally Blonde - The Musical: The Search for Elle Woods
Michael Kelly, Emmy-nominated television and film actor, best known for House of Cards. 
Edwin McCain, Singer-songwriter and musician
Chad Mureta, Entrepreneur, author, and mobile app developer
Elise Testone, Contestant on American Idol Season 11
Brooke Weisbrod, ESPN broadcaster

Notes

References

External links
 
 
 Coastal Carolina Athletics website

 
Universities and colleges accredited by the Southern Association of Colleges and Schools
Public universities and colleges in South Carolina
Education in Horry County, South Carolina
Educational institutions established in 1954
Buildings and structures in Conway, South Carolina
1954 establishments in South Carolina